is a railway station in the city of Tome, Miyagi Prefecture, Japan, operated by East Japan Railway Company (JR East).

Lines
Nitta Station is served by the Tōhoku Main Line, and is located 416.2 rail kilometers from the official starting point of the line at Tokyo Station.

Station layout
Nitta Station has one island platform and one side platforms connected to the station building by a footbridge; however track 2 of the island platform is not in use. The station is unattended.

Platforms

History
Nitta Station opened on January 4, 1894. The station was absorbed into the JR East network upon the privatization of the Japanese National Railways (JNR) on April 1, 1987.

Passenger statistics
In fiscal 2017, the station was used by an average of 244 passengers daily (boarding passengers only).

Surrounding area

Tome City Hall

See also
 List of Railway Stations in Japan

References

External links

  

Railway stations in Miyagi Prefecture
Tōhoku Main Line
Railway stations in Japan opened in 1894
Tome, Miyagi
Stations of East Japan Railway Company